Shaun Tomson (born 21 August 1955) is a South African professional surfer and former world champion, environmentalist, actor, author, and businessman. He has been listed among the top 10 surfers of the century, and was the 1977 World Surfing Champion.

Life and career
Tomson was born in Durban, South Africa, and is Jewish. As a Jewish athlete, he was inducted into the International Jewish Sports Hall of Fame in 1995. He learned to surf in the beachbreaks in and around Durban under the watchful eye of his father Ernie, and alongside older cousin Michael Tomson and brother Paul Tomson.

Tomson attended school in Durban - Clifton Preparatory, Carmel College, and the University of Natal, where he received a Bachelor of Commerce degree majoring in Business Finance. He graduated from Northeastern University with a Master of Science in Leadership with a focus on social change. Tomson went on to dominate amateur surfing competition in South Africa and began venturing over to Hawaii in the late 1960s, courtesy of a bar mitzvah present from his father. It was on one of these trips that an awestruck 14-year-old Tomson witnessed first hand the so-called "Biggest Wave Ever Ridden" by Californian Greg Noll at Mākaha in 1969. Hawaii's surf proved to be a daunting challenge for Tomson, but he continued to mature and train in South Africa's hollow waves, such as Cave Rock, the Bay of Plenty, and Jeffrey's Bay.

Tomson won 19 major professional surf events, has been listed as one of the 25 most influential surfers of the century and as one of the 10 greatest surfers of all time. During his career he was both the youngest and oldest surfer to win a pro event, and is considered to be one of the architects of professional surfing.

Surfing and the Free Ride generation 
In 1975, Tomson was an integral part of the "Free Ride" generation. Along with Australians Wayne Bartholomew, Mark Richards, Ian Cairns, Peter Townend, and Mark Warren, they rode the infamous waves along Oahu's legendary North Shore with a style, aggression, and raw courage unseen prior to their arrival. Collectively, these surfers changed the face of surfing and were the first to really apply themselves as serious professional surfers. With his good looks, eloquence, and undeniable athleticism, Tomson served by default as the face and voice of this movement and he is still viewed as the prototype blueprint for today's pro surfer, with legions of fans throughout the world. Tomson won the highly coveted International Professional Surfers World Championship in 1977.

On a performance level, Tomson completely changed the way the tube section of the wave was ridden, using a unique style of pumping and weaving through and around collapsing sections of the barrel. Even today, his electrifying performances at Off the Wall and Backdoor Pipeline stand the test of time. A memorable quote of his from the period was, "Time is expanded inside the tube." A very underrated aspect of Tomson's inventiveness was his in the tube punch throughs where he escaped unscathed from hideous closeout sections over a shallow reef.

In film 
Tomson has appeared in many films, including Free Ride, Fantasea, Many Classic Moments, and In God's Hands. Tomson also co-produced an award-winning full-length feature film about the benchmark mid-1970s surfing era called Bustin' Down the Door, which premiered in early 2008. He also wrote and narrated a documentary about Jeffreys Bay called A Pure Line.

Books and digital media 
Tomson is the author of the best-selling Surfer's Code – 12 Simple lessons for riding through life and the #1 Amazon teen bestseller: The Code - The Power of I Will. He also authored Bustin' Down the Door – Revolution of '75, a companion to the film of the same name and Krazy Kreatures – Under my Surfboard!, a collection of illustrated rhymes for children. In 2022, he released The Surfer and the Sage with Familius Publishing. 

Tomson has released 3 iPhone/iPad applications – Surfboards, a reference guide for surfboards;  Surfer – a digital form of Surfer's Code and Surf Creatures, animated rhymes for children.

Environmentalism 
Tomson is a board member and ambassador for Surfrider Foundation, the world's largest environmental group dedicated to protecting the world's oceans, waves, and beaches. In 1984 he was the first professional surfer to become a member of the foundation and was chairman of the advisory board. In 2002 he received the Surf Industry Manufacturer Association Environmentalist of the Year Award for his environmental efforts. Tomson also co-founded and remains affiliated with the environmentally active celebrity surfer organization Project Save Our Surf.

Business 
Tomson founded, managed, and sold two multi-million market-leading clothing brands – Instinct in the 1980s, and Solitude in the 1990s.

He is currently an inspirational speaker for some of the world's largest companies and talks about the influence of positive values on success in life and business based on his own experiences of overcoming seemingly insurmountable challenges, in and out of the surf. An attitude of Commitment and Positivity is the basis for Tomson's empowering business philosophy based on his "Surfer's Code – 12 Simple Lessons for Riding through Life". He has spoken internationally and inspired and touched the hearts of audiences as large as 3,000 people, has shared the stage with well-known personalities, including Sir Richard Branson and Malcolm Gladwell, and inspired corporations such as General Motors, Cisco, Price Waterhouse, Toys R Us, Sasol, Disney, Google, Primedia, MTN and Adcock Ingram.

Accolades

In 2014 Tomson was inducted into the Southern California Jewish Sports Hall of Fame. He has also been inducted into the Huntington Beach Surfing Walk of Fame (1997), the International Jewish Sports Hall of Fame (1998), the South African Sports Hall of Fame (1977), and received the SIMA Environmentalist of the Year Award (2002) and the Surfrider Lifetime Achievement Award (2009).

Personal life 
The Tomsons' son Mathew died at 15 years of age on 24 April 2006 in Durban, South Africa, from an accidental death caused by playing the "choking game."

Tomson lives with his wife in Montecito, California, in Santa Barbara, California, and surfs daily.

See also
 List of Jewish surfers

References

External links
 
 
 Surfline.com biography
 Surfhistory.com biography
 Surfrider Foundation
 Tomson on Channel24
 learnfrommylife feature
 International Jewish Sports Hall of Fame - Shaun Tomson
 Tomson profile page on BigSpeak.com

1955 births
International Jewish Sports Hall of Fame inductees
Living people
Sportspeople from Durban
South African Jews
South African surfers
South African writers
White South African people
World Surf League surfers
Jewish South African sportspeople
University of Natal alumni
Northeastern University alumni
People from Montecito, California